Qa is a letter of related and vertically oriented alphabets used to write Mongolic and Tungusic languages.

Mongolian language

Transcribes Chakhar ; Khalkha . Transliterated into Cyrillic with the letter .
 Produced with  using the Windows Mongolian keyboard layout.
 In the Mongolian Unicode block,  comes after  and before .

Distinction from other tooth-shaped letters by position in syllable sequence.
 A separated isolate-shaped   appears in the Uyghur loan title  'worthy of respect; reverend'.
 Derived from Old Uyghur merged gimel and heth.

 Derived from Old Uyghur kaph.

Notes

References 

Articles containing Mongolian script text
Mongolic letters
Mongolic languages
Tungusic languages